Carroll Morgan (October 3, 1947 – June 20, 2018) was a Canadian heavyweight boxer, who represented his native country at the 1972 Summer Olympics in Munich, West Germany. There he was defeated in the quarterfinals by Sweden's eventual bronze medalist Hasse Thomsén.

Morgan later trained people in the city where he lived. 

In 1990, Morgan was inducted into the Canadian Boxing Hall of Fame and was inducted twice into the Nova Scotia Sport Hall of Fame, in 1994 alongside his teammates from the 1966 X-Men football club of St. Francis Xavier University in Antigonish, Nova Scotia, and in 2008 as an amateur boxer. Morgan, who started boxing at age 20 while at St. F. X. University, was a member of the 1972 Canadian Olympic and 1974 Commonwealth teams, and held heavyweight titles seven times as provincial champion and three times as Canadian champion. During his boxing career, Morgan never lost a fight to another Canadian.

On June 20, 2018, Morgan died of a heart attack at his home in the Clayton Park area of Halifax.  He was 70.

1972 Olympic record
Below is the record of Carroll Morgan, a Canadian heavyweight boxer who competed at the 1972 Munich Olympics:

 Round of 16: defeated Fatai Ayinla (Nigeria) by decision, 3-2
 Quarterfinal: lost to Hasse Thomsén (Sweden) by third-round knockout

References

External links
 Canadian Olympic Committee

1947 births
2018 deaths
Heavyweight boxers
Boxers at the 1972 Summer Olympics
Olympic boxers of Canada
Boxers at the 1974 British Commonwealth Games
Commonwealth Games competitors for Canada
Sportspeople from Nova Scotia
People from Antigonish, Nova Scotia
Nova Scotia Sport Hall of Fame inductees
Canadian male boxers
Players of Canadian football from Nova Scotia
St. Francis Xavier X-Men football players